Oliver Kosturanov(1968–2014) was a Macedonian businessman, president of the board of directors of Makedonski Telekom, and SEAF's Director General for Macedonia.

Personal life
Kosturanov was born in Skopje, Republic of Macedonia. Besides his native Macedonian language, Kosturanov is fluent in English and the Slavic languages spoken in the Balkans.

Professional career

 2010–           Makedonski Telekom AD Skopje, President of board of directors
 2010–           T-Mobile Makedonija AD Skopje, Chairman of the Assembly of Sahreholders
 2009–           SEAF, Director General for Macedonia
 2007–           SIF (Small Investment Fund), Director General
 2006–           Macedonian Bank for Development Promotion, President of the Supervisory Board
 2004–           SPMG, managing director
 1999–2004, SEAF Macedonia, Senior Investment Officer
 1997–99, Macedonian Banking Operations Center (MBOC), Senior Banking Advisor
 1994–97, TTK Banka AD Skopje, Head of the Treasury department

Publications
 Investment Reform Index for South East Europe 2006, OECD
 SME Policy Index 2009, OECD
 Activities for Small and Medium Enterprises in Macedonia, 2002, NEPA

Interviews and newspapers publications
 Kapital, 2 October 2003
 Kapital, 21 October 2003
 Kapital, 27 November 2003
 Kapital, 11 December 2003
 Kapital, 19 January 2004
 Vreme, 10 September 2007

Awards
 University of Sheffield, alumnus of the month, January 2011

References

External links
 SEAF Website
 SEAF South Balkan Fund Website
 Makedonski Telekom Website
 T-Mobile Makedonija Website
 Macedonian Bank for Development Promotion Website

1968 births
Businesspeople in telecommunications
Living people